J. P. Bagerhatta was a freedom fighter and first General Secretary of the Communist Party of India with S. V. Ghate. S.V.Ghate became the sole general secretary and Bagerhatta was removed.

References

Communist Party of India politicians from Maharashtra